Dhruv Patel (born 11 October 2002) is an Indian cricketer. He made his first-class debut for Baroda in the 2017–18 Ranji Trophy on 17 November 2017. He made his List A debut on 20 February 2021, for Baroda in the 2020–21 Vijay Hazare Trophy.

References

External links
 

1997 births
Living people
Indian cricketers
Place of birth missing (living people)
Baroda cricketers